Arthur Brauss (born 24 July 1936) is a German actor, perhaps best known for his work in Sam Peckinpah's Cross of Iron.

Brauss was born in Augsburg, Germany.

Partial filmography

 Stop Train 349 (1963, directed by Rolf Hädrich), as I.M.P. 
  The Train (1964, directed by John Frankenheimer), as Lt. Pilzer
 Von Ryan's Express (1965, directed by Mark Robson), as Lt. Herman Gertel (uncredited)
 Die Rechnung – eiskalt serviert (1965, directed by Helmut Ashley), as Billy-Boy 
 Hot Pavements of Cologne (1967, directed by Ernst Hofbauer), as Paul Keil 
 Carmen, Baby (1967, directed by Radley Metzger), as Garcia
  (1968, directed by Hanns Schott-Schöbinger), as Joschi
 Sette baschi rossi (1969, directed by Mario Siciliano), as Sergente Kimber
 Dead Body on Broadway (1969, directed by Harald Reinl), as Hank 
  (1970, directed by Roger Fritz), as Mike
 Männer sind zum Lieben da / Atlantis – Ein Sommermärchen (1970, directed by Eckhart Schmidt), as Priest
  (1970, directed by Alfred Vohrer), as Casanova 
 Jonathan (1970, directed by Hans W. Geißendörfer), as Adolf
 Hauser's Memory (1970, directed by Boris Sagal), as Bak
 Jaider, der einsame Jäger (1971, directed by Volker Vogeler), as Bastian
 $ (1971, directed by Richard Brooks), as Candy Man
 The Goalkeeper's Fear of the Penalty (1972, directed by Wim Wenders), as Bloch
 Geradeaus bis zum Morgen (1972, directed by Peter Adam), as Luc
The Stuff That Dreams Are Made Of (1972, directed by Alfred Vohrer), as Comrade Michailow
 Cry of the Black Wolves (1972, directed by Harald Reinl), as Tornado Kid
 The Girl from Hong Kong (1973, directed by Jürgen Roland), as Delgado
  (1973, directed by Ernst Hofbauer), as Franz Kuppler, photographer (uncredited)
 Verflucht dies Amerika (1973, directed by Volker Vogeler), as Sebastian Jennerwein
  (1974–1975, TV miniseries), as Abdul Carraco
 The Swiss Conspiracy (1976, directed by Jack Arnold), as Andre Costa
  (1976, directed by Peter Schamoni), as James Wesley
 Cross of Iron (1977, directed by Sam Peckinpah), as Pvt. Zoll
 Mister Deathman (1977, directed by Michael D. Moore), as Vincent Napier
 Slavers (1978, directed by Jürgen Goslar), as Rustam
 Triangle of Venus (1978, directed by Hubert Frank), as Howard
 Avalanche Express (1979, directed by Mark Robson), as Neckermann
 The Rebel (1980, directed by Stelvio Massi), as Klaus Beitz
 Mein Freund Winnetou (1980, TV miniseries), as Lt. Robert Merril
 Escape to Victory (1981, directed by John Huston), as Capt. Lutz 
 The Winds of War (1983, TV miniseries), as SS Interrogator
 Happy Weekend (1983, directed by Murray Jordan)
 Raffl (1985, directed by Christian Berger)
 Großstadtrevier (1986–1991, TV series, 36 episodes), as Richard Block
 Ishtar (1987, directed by Elaine May), as German Gunrunner
 Itinéraire d'un enfant gâté (1988, directed by Claude Lelouch), as Photographer
 Gummibärchen küßt man nicht (1989, directed by Walter Bannert), as Colonel
 Confessional (1989, TV miniseries), as General Maslovsky
 My Blue Heaven (1990, directed by Herbert Ross), as Judge
 Knight Moves (1992, directed by Carl Schenkel), as Viktor Yurilivich
 Wir Enkelkinder (1992, directed by Bruno Jonas), as Merklein
 Murder at the Savoy (1993, TV film, directed by ), as Jürgen Hoffman
  (1995, TV miniseries), as Deterding
 Joseph (1995, TV film, directed by Roger Young), as Hamor
 Brennendes Herz (1995, directed by Peter Patzak)
 Ms. Bear (1997, directed by Paul Ziller), as Schroeder
 Contaminated Man (2000, directed by Anthony Hickox), as Lead Detective
 Der Fürst und das Mädchen (2007, TV series), as John Mc Gregor
 8 Uhr 28 (2010, directed by Christian Alvart), as Dr. Kugler

References

External links

1936 births
Actors from Augsburg
German male film actors
German male television actors
20th-century German male actors
Living people